The WCW Hardcore Championship was a professional wrestling Hardcore Championship contested for in World Championship Wrestling (WCW). During late 1999, WCW promoted various hardcore matches, bouts where there were no disqualifications or countouts, that mainly involved Norman Smiley and Brian Knobbs. The developing rivalry between the two wrestlers led WCW to announce the creation of the WCW Hardcore Championship in November 1999. In January 2001, the champion Meng signed a contract with the World Wrestling Federation (WWF) after his WCW contract expired. The WCW Hardcore Championship was vacated; a few months later, WCW was purchased by the WWF, and while the WWF used WCW's World Heavyweight, United States, Cruiserweight, and Tag Team Championships in the subsequent Invasion storyline, the WCW Hardcore Championship was not re-introduced.

Title reigns were determined by professional wrestling hardcore match types with wrestlers involved in pre-existing scripts feuds, plots and storylines or were awarded the title due to scripted circumstances. Wrestlers were portrayed as either villains or fan favorites as they followed a series of tension-building events, which culminated in a hardcore wrestling type match or series of matches for the championship. The inaugural champion was Norman Smiley, who defeated Brian Knobbs at Mayhem. Before the promotion's purchase, the title was vacant, though, Meng was the final wrestler to hold the championship. The title was won in Canadian municipalities and in American states. Smiley held the title the longest at 51 days, and at less than one day, Carl Ouellet has the shortest title reign. Brian Knobbs and Terry Funk both won the title on three occasions, the most in the championship's history; this also ties with the number of times the title was vacated. Overall, there were 18 reigns.

Reigns

Combined reigns

References
General

Specific

External links
Wrestling-Titles.com
Online World of Wrestling.com

World Championship Wrestling champions lists